The 2012 Southend-on-Sea Council election took place on 3 May 2012 to elect members of the Southend-on-Sea Borough Council in England. This was the same day as other 2012 United Kingdom local elections.

Results summary

Ward results

Belfairs

Blenheim Park

Chalkwell

Eastwood Park

Kursaal

Leigh

Milton

Prittlewell

St. Laurence

St. Luke's

Shoeburyness

Southchurch

Thorpe

Victoria

West Leigh

West Shoebury

Westborough

References

2012 English local elections
2012
2010s in Essex